Opal is a hamlet in central Alberta, Canada within Thorhild County. Originally named Rutherford after Alberta's first premier, Alexander Cameron Rutherford but was renamed to the unique "Opal" when the first post office opened on November 15, 1912.

Demographics 
The population of Opal according to the 2009 municipal census conducted by Thorhild County is 24.

See also 
List of communities in Alberta
List of hamlets in Alberta

References 

Hamlets in Alberta
Thorhild County